The A3 road is a federal road in Sabah.

References

Malaysian Federal Roads
Roads in Sabah